His Excellency Onkokame Kitso Mokaila is the ambassador for Botswana to the United States of America. He was elected to the National Assembly in the October 2004 general election, representing the governing Botswana Democratic Party.

Mokaila appointed as the Minister of Environment, Wildlife and Tourism by President Festus Mogae on 9 November 2004. He was appointed as Minister of Minerals, Energy and Water Resources on October 12, 2012. On September 17, 2020 he was accredited as the ambassador to the United States.

Mokaila studied to become an auto technician at the Swaziland College of Technology, and after graduating he joined the Botswana Defence Force in 1980. While serving in the army, he studied mechanical engineering at Military College of Electronics and Mechanical Engineering, India Secunderabad. In 1988 he retired from the army with the rank of captain, and he subsequently worked at International Computing Limited (ICL), Hyundai Motor Distributors, Wheels of Africa, and Unisis Africa.

Gallery of photos

References

Year of birth missing (living people)
Living people
Members of the National Assembly (Botswana)
Government ministers of Botswana
Botswana Democratic Party politicians